Parti Kebangsaan Melayu Malaya (PKMM), also known as the Malay Nationalist Party, was founded on 17 October 1945  in Ipoh, Perak. The party was the first Malay political party formed after the Japanese occupation of Malaya.

The main goal of the PKMM was to achieve full independence for Malaya and to oppose any form of British colonial rule. The five principles adopted by the PKMM were a belief in God, nationalism, sovereignty of the people, universal brotherhood and social justice. These principles mirrored the Pancasila of Indonesian nationalism and many of the PKMM activists were influenced by nationalist developments in Indonesia and sought for the unification of Indonesian and Malay nationalist struggles in an Indonesia Raya.

In response to British proposals for a Federation of Malaya, PKMM, as a member of PUTERA, formed an alliance with other predominantly non-Malay political groups organized under the All-Malayan Council of Joint Action, forming the AMCJA-PUTERA coalition. Together they formulated the People's Constitutional Proposals, calling for a common citizenship and democratic governance, which was rejected by the British.

With the establishment of the Federation of Malaya and the British crackdown on parties of the Malay Left and the communists of the MCP, PKMM disbanded though many of its members would go on to play important roles in Malayan politics.

History

Emergence 

PKMM was established on 17 October 1945 at its inaugural meeting from 16–17 October 1945. Apart from states representatives, present also was a representative from Pattani, Tengku Mahmood Mahyiddeen and a royal representative of the Sultan of Selangor, Sultan Hishammuddin Abdul Aziz Alam Shah who contributed $50,000. The central committee consisted of: 
 Mokhtaruddin Lasso - General Leader 
 Dr Burhanuddin Al-Helmy - First Vice Chief 
 Baharuddin Tahir@Taharuddin - Second Vice Chair 
 Dahari Ali - Secretary 
 Zulkifli Auni - Vice Secretary 
 Ahmad Boestamam - Youth Chief 
 Katijah Ali - Women's Affairs Chief 
 Arshad Ashaari - Treasurer 
 Salleh - Religious Chief

PKMM's inaugural conference ran from 30 November 1945 to 4 December 1945 and featured a wide variety of activists from diverse backgrounds including communists, royalists, nationalists, Islamic preachers, socialists, students and proponents of Malay culture and customs. The congress agreed that PKMM would be guided by the following goals: 
 To unite the Malay race while planting the spirit of nationalism in the minds and hearts of the Malays so as to unite Malaya with the larger family of the Indonesia Raya.
 To advocate freedom in speech, movement, thought and education.
 To reinvigorate the economic status of the Malay race by promoting entrepreneurship and agriculture so as to enhance the Malay quality of life.
 To obtain freedom in cultivating crops. Cultivators should be freed from land taxes and be permitted to sell their harvests in any market.
 To demand that the Malays be provided with national schools where they could study any subjects for free.
 To demand freedom to publish books and teach democracy in order to uplift the state of Malay politics and encourage national among Malays.
 The PKMM would work together in harmony with other races in the country to create a Malayan United Front to achieve independence and prosperity for Malaya as part of the Republic of Indonesia Raya.
 To support the Indonesians in their movement to gain independence.
Mokhtaruddin Lasso's decision to leave Malaya for Indonesia in 1946 saw Burhanuddin Al-Helmy assume the position of party leader. The new leadership was organised as follows:
 Burhanuddin Al-Helmy - General Leader
 Ishak Haji Muhammad (Pak Sako) - Vice Chief
 Zulkifli Auni - Secretary
 M. Maza - Vice Secretary
 Baharuddin Tahir@Taharuddin - Treasurer
 Ahmad Boestamam - Youth Chief
 Shamsuddin Salleh - Social Activities

As of 1947 the party recorded 53,380 members with its strongholds in Perak and Pahang.

Tensions between Burhanuddin Al-Helmy and youth leader Ahmad Boestamam, who advocated radical actions to challenge colonial rule led to establishment of separate women's and youth wings. Angkatan Pemuda Insaf (API) formed the radical youth wing of the party led by Ahmad Boestamam whilst Angkatan Wanita Segar (AWAS) formed the women's wing of the party led by Shamisah Fakeh.

Aftermath 
With the British declaration of Emergency in 1948 and a crackdown on parties of the Malay Left and the MCP the ability of the PKMM to operate was much reduced. API was the first organisation to be banned and nationalist leaders such as Ahmad Boestamam, Ishak Haji Muhammad, Katijah Sidek and Burhanuddin Al-Helmy were imprisoned. In the aftermath PKMM activism splintered. Some retired from political activity altogether, others sought to generate political change from within UMNO itself, with former KMM and PKMM member Mustapha Hussein losing to Tunku Abdul Rahman by one vote in the contest for the Chairmanship of UMNO. Others such as Shamsiah Fakeh, Wahi Anuwar and Musa Ahmad fled to the jungles and allied themselves with the community guerilla war against the British. Whilst others would go onto found or lead other nationalist, socialist or Islamist political parties. Thus upon their release Ahmad Boestamam would found the Parti Rakyat whilst Ishak Haji Muhammad would found the Labour Party, both would later go on to found the Parti Marhaen Malaysia, whilst Burhanuddin Al-Helmy would go onto lead the Parti Islam Se-Malaysia from 1956 to his death in 1969.

See also 
 Kesatuan Melayu Muda
 Rukun 13

References

Sources 
 Amoroso, Donna (2014) Traditionalism and the Ascendancy of the Malay Ruling Class in Colonial Malaya, Petaling Jaya: SIRD
 Ariffin Omar (2015) Bangsa Melayu: Malay Concepts of Democracy and Community 1945-1950, Second Edition, Petaling Jaya: SIRD
 Mustapha Hussain (2004) Malay Nationalism before UMNO: The Memoirs of Mustapha Hussain, Singapore: NUS Press
 Noor, Farish (2015) The Malaysian Islamic Party PAS 1951-2013: Islamism in a Mottled Nation, Petaling Jaya: SIRD
 Shamsiah Fakeh (2009) The Memoirs of Shamsiah Fakeh: From AWAS to 10th Regiment, Petaling Jaya: SIRD

Political parties established in 1945
Federation of Malaya
Political parties by country and ideology
1945 establishments in British Malaya
Defunct political parties in Malaysia
1948 disestablishments in British Malaya